The Thirteenth Tripura Assembly was formed after 2023 Tripura Legislative Assembly election. Elections were held in 60 constituencies on 16 February 2023. Votes were counted on 2 March 2023.

History 
Bharatiya Janata Party led alliance won election with 33(BJP 32 + IPFT 1) seats while newcomer Tipra Motha Party become second largest party with 13 seats. Communist Party of India (Marxist) led Secular Democratic Forces won 14(11 CPIM + 3 INC).

Notable Positions

Party wise distribution

Members

References

External links
Tripura Lok Sabha Election Result Website
Official government website of Tripura

Tripura Legislative Assembly
Tripura MLAs 2023–2028